is a Japanese composer. His compositions include the music from the film The Girl Who Leapt Through Time and anime series Kaiba, Kurozuka, and Shigurui: Death Frenzy. He also composed the soundtrack for the NHK special programs New Silk Road 2007 and Nihonjinn Harukana tabi. He is a member of the band Ubud.

Discography
 Albums
 Asian Drums (Pacific Moon, 2000)
 Asian Drums II (Pacific Moon, 2001)
 Matsuri (Pacific Moon, 2007)
 Journey to the East Edo (Pacific Moon, 2010), with Bonten, Yoshida's contributions were taken from Asian Drums and Asian Drums II.
 Warriors – Kiyoshi Yoshida feat. Yukihiko Mitsuka (Pacific Moon, 2012)

Filmography

References

External links
 
 Kiyoshi Yoshida profile at Pacific Moon Records
 Kiyoshi Yoshida at 1up music (archive) 
 
 
 Kiyoshi Yoshida at Oricon 

1964 births
Anime composers
Japanese composers
Japanese film score composers
Japanese male composers
Japanese male film score composers
Living people